Enrico Rabbachin (born 3 May 1943) is an Italian sports shooter. He competed in the mixed 50 metre free pistol event at the 1980 Summer Olympics.

References

External links
 

1943 births
Living people
Italian male sport shooters
Olympic shooters of Italy
Shooters at the 1980 Summer Olympics
People from Vigevano
Sportspeople from the Province of Pavia